Derocrepis is a genus of flea beetles in the family Chrysomelidae. There are 7 described species in Derocrepis.

Selected species
 Derocrepis aesculi (Dury, 1906)
 Derocrepis carinata (Linell, 1897)
 Derocrepis erythropus (F. E. Melsheimer, 1847) (red-legged flea beetle)
 Derocrepis oregoni Hatch, 1971

References

 Riley, Edward G., Shawn M. Clark, and Terry N. Seeno (2003). "Catalog of the leaf beetles of America north of Mexico (Coleoptera: Megalopodidae, Orsodacnidae and Chrysomelidae, excluding Bruchinae)". Coleopterists Society Special Publication no. 1, 290.

Further reading

 Arnett, R. H. Jr., M. C. Thomas, P. E. Skelley and J. H. Frank. (eds.). (21 June 2002). American Beetles, Volume II: Polyphaga: Scarabaeoidea through Curculionoidea. CRC Press LLC, Boca Raton, Florida .
 Arnett, Ross H. (2000). American Insects: A Handbook of the Insects of America North of Mexico. CRC Press.
 Richard E. White. (1983). Peterson Field Guides: Beetles. Houghton Mifflin Company.

External links

 NCBI Taxonomy Browser, Derocrepis

Alticini
Chrysomelidae genera
Taxa named by Julius Weise